S. Duane "Duey" Stroebel Jr. (born September 1, 1959) is an American politician and businessman. He is a Republican member of the Wisconsin Senate, representing the 20th district since 2015. He previously served in the Wisconsin Assembly, representing the 60th Assembly district from 2011 until 2015.

Background and education
Stroebel was born in Cedarburg, Wisconsin. He received his bachelor's and master's degrees from the University of Wisconsin–Madison and has a real estate business in Cedarburg, Wisconsin.

Political career
Stroebel served on the Cedarburg School Board from 2007 to 2012.

On May 3, 2011, in a special election, Stroebel was elected to the Wisconsin State Assembly.

In April 2014, Stroebel announced he would seek the Republican nomination for the U.S. House of Representatives in Wisconsin's 6th district. Stroebel lost the Republican primary, finishing third with slightly under 25% of the vote, trailing then-State Senator Glenn Grothman, who won the nomination, and Joe Leibham, who came in second. Grothman went on to won the general election.

Stroebel ran for 20th Senate District, which was vacated by Grothman after beginning his tenure in Congress. He faced Ozaukee County Board Chairman Lee Schlenvogt and Tiffany Koehler in the Republican primary. Stroebel and the other two candidates emphasized their support for right-to-work legislation. He won the election with 67% of the vote and was unopposed in the general election.

Stroebel has been on the Joint Finance Committee, and Committee on Government Operations, Technology, and Consumer Protection.

In 2019, Stroebel opposed Governor Tony Evers' proposal to decriminalize marijuana, and equated decriminalization with legalization.

In 2020, during the COVID-19 pandemic, Stroebel opposed Governor Evers' order requiring the use of face coverings in public indoor places to prevent the spread of the virus; along with fellow Republican senator Steve Nass, Stroebel called for a legislative session to nullify the order. The same year, Stroebel also criticized Wisconsin State Fair organizers for deciding to cancel the annual event, accusing the Fair of taking a "defeatist approach."

In 2021, Stroebel introduced legislation in Wisconsin to restrict voting rights, part of a wider nationwide push by Republicans to make it more difficult to vote, a campaign launched by Republican officials after Donald Trump was defeated in the 2020 presidential election. Stroebel's legislation would restrict absentee voting and ballot collection, and impose stricter requirements on voters who are "indefinitely confined" due to age or disability. Disability rights groups opposed the changes.

References

External links
 
 
 Senator Duey Stroebel at Wisconsin Legislature

People from Cedarburg, Wisconsin
University of Wisconsin–Madison alumni
Businesspeople from Wisconsin
School board members in Wisconsin
Republican Party members of the Wisconsin State Assembly
Living people
1959 births
21st-century American politicians
People from Saukville, Wisconsin